Italian comics, also known as fumetto , plural form fumetti , are comics that originate in Italy. The most popular Italian comics have been translated into many languages. The term fumetto (literally little puff of smoke) refers to the distinctive word balloons that contain the dialogue in comics (also called nuvoletta, "little cloud", in Italian).

In English, the term fumetti can refer to photo comics, regardless of origin or language.

History 

Italian fumetto has its roots in periodicals aimed at younger readers and in the satirical publications of the 19th century.  These magazines published cartoons and illustrations for educational and propagandist purposes. The first illustrated satirical publication appeared in 1848, in L'Arlecchino, a daily paper published in Naples.  Other noteworthy examples of satirical papers of the period include Lo Spirito Folletto published in Milan, Turin's Il Fischietto and Il Fanfulla, established in Rome in 1872. As far as publications for kids, some of the most significant titles of the period are Il Giornale per i Fanciulli (1834), Il Giovinetto Italiano (1849), and Giornale per i bambini (1881).In 1899 Il Novellino debuted. The paper was the first to publish Outcault's Yellow Kid in Italy in 1904, but the first Italian comic did not appear until four years later.

Birth 
On December 27, 1908, the first mainstream publication primarily for comics, Il Corriere dei Piccoli, appeared on Italian newstands. The first issue introduced readers to the adventures of Bilbolbul by Attilio Mussino, featuring a little black kid who is considered the first Italian comic character.

Despite being officially considered the birthplace of fumetto, the Corrierino, as it was nicknamed, did not use balloons in the stories that it publishes, opting instead for captions in verse. Regardless, the sequential narration and the recurring characters made the publication the first Italian comic magazine.

The most prolific comics illustrator before World War I was Antonio Rubino. Both Mussino and Rubino based their strips on parodies of school learning: Bilbolbul is a parody of idioms, while "Quadratino" (literally "Little Square") is a parody of geometry.

Il Corrierino introduced American comics to an Italian audience: "Happy Hooligan" was renamed "Fortunello", "The Katzenjammer Kids" became "Bibì e Bibò", Bringing Up Father was "Arcibaldo e Petronilla", "Felix the Cat" became "Mio Mao".

Following Il Corrierino'''s spectacular success (reaching 700 000 copies), several other periodicals appeared during the following years: Il Giornaletto (1910), Donnina (1914), L'Intrepido (1920), and Piccolo mondo (1924).

 Fumetto during Fascism 
The fascist regime was quick to recognize the potential for propaganda through the new medium. During the 1920s several periodicals published educational comics for Italian youth, including Il Giornale dei Balilla (1923) and La piccola italiana (1927).

The three most popular characters of the period, reprinted for decades on Corrierino, were:
"Il Signor Bonaventura" by Sergio Tofano (1917), was the Italian response to "Happy Hooligan", with a big difference: if the latter is always unlucky, at the end of every story Bonaventura wins a million liras.
"Sor Pampurio" (an Italian equivalent of "Bringing Up Father") by Carlo Bisi (1925), was a parody of parvenus: not really Fascist, it expresses bourgeois classism.
"Marmittone" by Bruno Angoletta (1929), was a mildly antimilitaristic strip, the maximum anti-authoritarianism allowed by Fascism.

Beginning January 1, 1939, the publication of foreign comics was forbidden, and Italian material was required to follow a strict standard, exalting heroism, patriotism, and the superiority of the Italian race. To work around these restrictions, some publishers simply renamed American heroes with Italian names.  The only exception to the censorship was Topolino, the Italian name for Mickey Mouse, published by Nerbini starting on December 31, 1931. Apparently, the reason behind this special treatment for Walt Disney's character was Benito Mussolini's children's passion for the little mouse.  In 1935 Nerbini sold Topolino to Mondadori, which published it with great success until 1988.

In 1932 Milan publisher Lotario Vecchi started Jumbo, a weekly magazine that many consider the first true Italian comics publication. The magazine reached a circulation of 350,000 copies, sanctioning comics as a mainstream medium with broad appeal.

In 1937 Il Vittorioso appeared, a Catholic magazine entirely composed of Italian comics.  It was an attempt to compete with similar secular publications like L'Avventuroso (1934), Il Monello (1933), and L'Audace (1937).

 After World War II: Bonelli and the rise of the comic book 
The end of World War II marked a flurry of activity in the Italian comic press: many titles that were forced to suspend publication during the war come back to saturate the newsstands, joined by new publications often backed by improvised publishers looking for a quick buck. Finally this oversupply of comic material resulted in a crisis of the traditional comic magazine. Among the numerous publications of the period were L'Avventura (1944), a Roman magazine that presented American adventure strips like Mandrake, L'Uomo Mascherato (The Phantom), and Flash Gordon. Another Roman publication appeared in 1945: Robinson, a first attempt to target a more adult audience. It introduced several American characters like Prince Valiant, Tarzan, Secret Agent X-9, Rip Kirby, Li'l Abner and Dick Tracy. Robinson lasted until 1947, publishing 90 issues.

In 1945, one of the most original magazines of the period was born: L'asso di Picche published in Venice as a result of the work of a group of young Venetian artists, including Alberto Ongaro, Damiano Damiani, Dino Battaglia, Rinaldo D'Ami, and above all Fernando Carcupino and Hugo Pratt. Their distinctive approach to the art form earned them the name of "Venetian School" of comics. Among the characters created for the magazine were Pratt's L'Asso di Picche, Battaglia's Junglemen, Draky and Robin Hood.

Inspired by the success of the Catholic Il Vittorioso, the Italian Communist party decided to use the comic medium for their own purposes: in 1949 Il Pioniere was born. Aimed at a very young audience, the new publication presented fantasy material as well as adventures, with an eye to the social issues of the period.

On Il Vittorioso began the career of the most famous satirical comic writer of post-war Italy, Benito Jacovitti. However, his most popular character, Cocco Bill (1957), a parody of Western comics, was published in the newspaper Il Giorno and then in the other Catholic comic magazine Il Giornalino.

In 1954 Il Disco Volante began publication. It is the Italian version of British weekly Eagle, and introduced Dan Dare to the Italian public. In 1955 Tintin appeared, adapted from the French Tintin magazine, which first presented Franco-Belgian comics to the Italian public.

But the most significant phenomenon of the period was the appearance of comics books. Printed in a variety of formats, from strip size to booklets to giant size, they presented collected stories from the periodicals as well as new adventures of Italian characters. It is on the comic books pages that heroes made in Italy gained popularity, eventually overshadowing their American counterparts.

Among the host of Italian series that were created during these years, Tex Willer is without doubt the most renowned. Born on September 30, 1948, from the imagination of Gian Luigi Bonelli and from the pencil of Aurelio Galleppini, Tex Willer became the model for a line of publications that became known as Bonelliano, from the name of the publisher. These comic books presented complete stories in 100+ black and white pages in a pocket book format. The subject matter was always adventure, whether western, horror, mystery or science fiction. The bonelliani are to date the most popular form of comics in the country.

Some of the series that followed Tex Willer were Zagor (1961), a tomahawk-wielding hero who protects the imaginary Darkwood forest in eastern US, Comandante Mark (1966), featuring a soldier in the American independence war, and more recently Mister No (1975), about an American pilot who operates a small tourist flying agency in the Amazonian jungle, and Martin Mystère (1982), featuring an anthropologist/archaeologist/art historian who investigates paranormal phenomena and archaeological mysteries.

Another popular series, Diabolik featuring a criminal mastermind, has been published since the 1960s, and influenced later series such as Kriminal and Satanik (see Fumetti neri). The latter was created in the 1960s by one of the most famous duos of comics history, Magnus & Bunker, whose most outstanding creation, however, is the humorous espionage series Alan Ford (1969).

Another famous author of humouristic strips is Franco Bonvicini, whose Sturmtruppen met wide success abroad.

In the 1970s and early 80s, many young intellectual artists centred around the famous student city of Bologna began to be influenced by the underground comic scene of the United States, typified by the work of Robert Crumb. Artists such as Andrea Pazienza, Filippo Scòzzari, Stefano Tamburini, Tanino Liberatore, and Massimo Mattioli published stories with dark and surreal themes, ranging from political activism, to struggles with drug addiction and the disagio and disillusionment of youth culture in Italy. Many of the comics were extremely violent and sexual and attempted to stretch the comic genre to its vary limits in both style and "good taste." Satirical magazines such as Frigidaire and Il Male often printed these stories in episodic formats or as vignettes in their monthly publications.

Though read by a more restricted audience, in the past years comics series with the greatest critical success are Corto Maltese, by Hugo Pratt, and Valentina by Guido Crepax. While the former is a kind of summa of the evolution into an adult form of the classic adventure comics, the latter gave birth to that special kind of erotic comics quite typical of the Italian scene, and whose main pupils have been in more recent years Milo Manara and Paolo Eleuteri Serpieri.

Disney Italia
Italy also produces many Disney comics, i.e., stories featuring Disney characters (from Mickey Mouse and Donald Duck universes). After the 1960s, American artists of Disney comics, such as Carl Barks and Floyd Gottfredson did not produce as many stories as in the past. At present American production of new stories has dwindled (Don Rosa publishes in Europe), and this niche has been filled by companies in South America, Denmark and Italy. The Italian 'Scuola disneyana' has produced several innovations: building the Italian standard length for stories (30 pages), a pocket book format with 3 strips a page, reinterpreting famous works of literature in 'Parodie', long stories up to 400 pages.

Among the most important artists and authors are Marco Rota, Romano Scarpa, Giorgio Cavazzano, Massimo De Vita, Giovan Battista Carpi and Guido Martina. The best known Disney character created in Italy is Paperinik (known as Duck Avenger or Phantom Duck to English audiences).

Italy prints around 8000 pages of new Disney stories per year, exported worldwide (it makes up 50% of the total production). The main publication, digest size Topolino, prints only new stories every week, but there exist 32 different series of reprints going on, for 30 million of copies sold each year.
Since the late 1990s, Disney Italia produced innovative series like PK (Paperinik stories with an American superheroes flavour), W.I.T.C.H. or Monster Allergy.

Notable authors and artists

 Alessandro Biffignandi
 Antonio Rubino
 Antonio Serra
 Alfredo Castelli
 Aurelio Galleppini
 Attilio Micheluzzi
 Ade Capone
 Angela Giussani
 Andrea Pazienza
 Andrea Lavezzolo
 Bruno Angoletta
 Bruno Bozzetto
 Bepi Vigna
 Benito Jacovitti
 Claudio Castellini
 Dino Battaglia
 Dario Guzzon
 Emanuele Taglietti
 Ferdinando Tacconi
 Franco Bonvicini
 Fernando Carcupino
 Franco Saudelli
 Giancarlo Alessandrini
 Gianni De Luca
 Giovanni Gualdoni
 Giovanni Sinchetto
 Giancarlo Berardi
 Guido Buzzelli
 Gian Luigi Bonelli
 Giorgio Cavazzano
 Guido Crepax
 Gianluca Costantini
 Hugo Pratt
 Ivo Milazzo
 Luciano Bernasconi
 Luciano Bottaro
 Lorenzo Mattotti
 Luciana Giussani
 Leonardo Ortolani
 Luca Enoch
 Max Bunker, pseudonym of Luciano Secchi
 Milo Manara
 Michelle Medda
 Maurizio Colombo
 Massimo Rotundo
 Mauro Boselli
 Pietro Sartoris
 Pino Daeni, pseudonym of Pino Dangelico
 Paolo Eleuteri Serpieri
 Renzo Calegari
 Roberto Renzi
 Magnus, pseudonym of Roberto Raviola
 Romano Scarpa
 Stefano Tamburini
 Sergio Tofano
 Sergio Toppi
 Silvia Ziche
 Sergio Bonelli
 Tanino Liberatore
 Tiziano Sclavi
 Vittorio Giardino
 Walter Molino

Notable comics 

 Bonelli adventure comics 
 Tex Willer by Gian Luigi Bonelli (since 1948)
 Zagor by Sergio Bonelli (since 1965)
 Martin Mystère by Alfredo Castelli (since 1982)
 Dylan Dog by Tiziano Sclavi (since 1986)
 Nathan Never by Michele Medda, Antonio Serra and Bepi Vigna (since 1991)
 Mister No by Sergio Bonelli (from 1975 to 2006)
 Ken Parker by Giancarlo Berardi and Ivo Milazzo (from 1977 to 1998)

 Adventure comics 
 Corto Maltese,  Sergeant Kirk, Fort Wheeling, Jesuit Joe, Morgan, all by Hugo Pratt
 Diabolik by Angela and Luciana Giussani
 Kriminal and Satanik by Max Bunker and Magnus
 Lo Sconosciuto (The Unknown) by Magnus
 Lazarus Ledd by Ade Capone
 RanXerox by Tanino Liberatore and Stefano Tamburini

 Humour comics 
 Bilbolbul by Attilio Mussino
 Il Signor Bonaventura by Sto
 Marmittone by Bruno Angoletta
 Alan Ford and Maxmagnus by Max Bunker and Magnus
 Cattivik by Bonvi (later Silver)
 Lupo Alberto by Silver
 Sturmtruppen by Bonvi
 Cocco Bill by Benito Jacovitti
 Rat-Man by Leo Ortolani
 Topolino Erotic comics 
 Click (Il Gioco) and Giuseppe Bergman by Milo Manara
 Valentina by Guido Crepax
 Druuna by Paolo Eleuteri Serpieri
 Calavera by Enrico Teodorani and Joe Vigil
 Djustine by Enrico Teodorani

 Fantasy comics 
 W.I.T.C.H. 
 Monster Allergy Gormiti Angel's Friends 
 Winx Club''

See also 

 Donald Duck pocket books
 For a non-exhaustive list of Italian authors, see List of comic creators
 For a non-exhaustive list of Italian comic books, see List of comic books

References

External links 

 afNews: daily news and all kind of information about fumetti and comic art. Press agency by Gianfranco Goria
 uBC Fumetti: fumetti from publisher Bonelli, with translations in English and other languages
 Museo del Fumetto Fondazione Franco Fossati 
 Slumberland - Encyclopedia of Italian comics 
 Website TexBR Italian comics of Sergio Bonelli Editore 

 
Italian culture
Comics